Eskdale is a rural settlement in the Hastings District and Hawke's Bay region of New Zealand's North Island. It is located north of Napier on State Highway 5, near the mouth of the Esk River.

Description and history
The valley has many vineyards, wineries, orchards and fishing spots. The local Eskdale War Memorial Church was designed by James Chapman-Taylor, and dedicated to Percival Moore Beattie, a local man killed during World War I.

The river has a history of flooding. Flash flooding inundated the settlement in March 2018, leaving most of the local holiday parks underwater. Large parts of the valley were inudated during Cyclone Gabrielle in February 2023. The floods caused significant damage in the settlement, destoying houses and sections of State Highway 5 and the Palmerston North–Gisborne Railway Line.

A wildfire broke out near Eskdale in March 2019.

Demographics

Puketapu-Eskdale had a population of 2,673 at the 2018 New Zealand census, an increase of 489 people (22.4%) since the 2013 census, and an increase of 621 people (30.3%) since the 2006 census. There were 915 households, comprising 1,392 males and 1,284 females, giving a sex ratio of 1.08 males per female. The median age was 45.5 years (compared with 37.4 years nationally), with 480 people (18.0%) aged under 15 years, 414 (15.5%) aged 15 to 29, 1,395 (52.2%) aged 30 to 64, and 384 (14.4%) aged 65 or older.

Ethnicities were 88.3% European/Pākehā, 13.6% Māori, 5.2% Pacific peoples, 1.2% Asian, and 1.3% other ethnicities. People may identify with more than one ethnicity.

The percentage of people born overseas was 17.6, compared with 27.1% nationally.

Although some people chose not to answer the census's question about religious affiliation, 53.2% had no religion, 37.3% were Christian, 1.1% had Māori religious beliefs, 0.1% were Muslim, 0.3% were Buddhist and 1.8% had other religions.

Of those at least 15 years old, 453 (20.7%) people had a bachelor's or higher degree, and 348 (15.9%) people had no formal qualifications. The median income was $36,500, compared with $31,800 nationally. 495 people (22.6%) earned over $70,000 compared to 17.2% nationally. The employment status of those at least 15 was that 1,272 (58.0%) people were employed full-time, 363 (16.6%) were part-time, and 39 (1.8%) were unemployed.

Education

It moved to its current site in 2003. It has strong ties to both the Anglican Church and to Māori culture.

References

Hastings District
Populated places in the Hawke's Bay Region
Populated places around Hawke Bay